"A Tale of 2 Citiez" is a song by American rapper J. Cole from his third album, 2014 Forest Hills Drive. The song samples "Blocka" by Pusha T and "Bring Em Out" by T.I. It was produced by Vinylz. The song was certified 2× Platinum by the Recording Industry Association of America (RIAA), selling over 2,000,000 copies in the United States.

Remixes
On January 28, 2015, Juicy J released a remix to the song in honor of J. Cole's birthday. On November 27, Kendrick Lamar released a remix for Black Friday, as Cole put out a remix to Alright the same day.

Critical reception
"A Tale of 2 Citiez" has received mixed reviews from music critics. Marshall Gu of PopMatters was quoted as saying, "Thankfully, the album manage to gain a steady footing after its shaky start." “A Tale of 2 Citiez” could gain from just being a tad faster to match the menace, but the menace is there—both in the twisted soul sample punctuating each line and with J. Cole's own rapping (rhyming “tints” with “rinsed” with “since” with “limits” with “pimps” and finally “glimpse” in the first verse)."

Certifications

References

2014 songs
J. Cole songs
Songs written by J. Cole
Songs written by Vinylz
Song recordings produced by Vinylz